Apollo was built in Bermuda in 1798. From 1803 she made two voyages as a Liverpool-based slave ship. The French captured her in port at Dominica in 1805.

1st slave trading voyage (1803–1804): Captain Cummins acquired a letter of marque on 9 August 1803. He sailed from Liverpool on 8 September 1803. Apollo gathered her slaves and delivered 169 slaves to Dominica, on or just prior to 25 March 1804. While she was on her way an unknown vessel had approached at 9pm, and followed her throughout the night. Next morning at 8am the privateer, of 12 guns and 20–80 men, commenced an engagement. After about an hour the privateer sailed away. Apollo did not report having sustained casualties. She sailed for Liverpool on 30 April, and arrived there on 24 May. She had left Liverpool with 21 crew members and she suffered three crew deaths on her voyage.

2nd slave trading voyage (1804–1805): Captain John Cummins sailed from Liverpool on 31 July 1804. Apollo gathered her slaves at New Calabar. She delivered 169 slaves to Dominica on 22 January 1805. She had left Liverpool with 26 crew members and suffered three crew deaths on her voyage.

Apollo was sold at Dominica.

Fate
On 22 February 1805 the French raided Dominica. They left five days later, but not before capturing a dozen or so vessels in port, Apollo among them. The French took their prizes into Guadeloupe on 1 March.

Citations

1798 ships
Ships built in Bermuda
Age of Sail merchant ships of England
Liverpool slave ships
Captured ships